Natick Center station is an MBTA Commuter Rail station in Natick, Massachusetts served by the Framingham/Worcester Line. The station, located below grade in a wide cut adjacent to North Main Street (Route 27), has two side platforms serving the line's two tracks. The second-busiest non-accessible station on the system, it is undergoing a major accessibility renovation and modernization from 2020 to 2024.

History

Early history

The Boston & Worcester Railroad, extending outwards from Boston, was completed Natick in August 1834. The line was double tracked through Natick in 1839, by which time a station had been established. Two other stations were located in Natick: Lake Crossing (at Bacon Street on the border with Wellesley to the east) and Walkerville (at Speen Street to the west). Neither lasted long into the 20th century.

The  Saxonville Branch opened from Natick to the Saxonville section of Framingham on July 6, 1846, with through trains to Boston. Although branch ridership was never high, these trains were timed to allow commuting from Natick for the first time. Stations on the branch included Felchville (at Fisher Street), Cochituate (at Commonwealth Road on the Natick/Framingham border), and Saxonville.

Longfellow station

The B&A extended third and fourth tracks from Riverside to Lake Crossing in 1894, and through Natick in 1896. During that construction, the line was realigned north (primarily to eliminate a sharp curve west of downtown) and lowered into a wide cut through downtown Natick to eliminate grade crossings with a number of streets. (Middlesex Avenue and the Middlesex Path now lie on the original alignment.) A new granite and brownstone station designed by Alexander Wadsworth Longfellow, Jr., a student of H.H. Richardson (who had designed nine stations for the B&A in the 1880s), opened in 1897. The New York Central Railroad acquired the line in 1900.

Decline
The lightly used Saxonville Branch never saw more than three daily round trips; passenger service was discontinued effective February 17, 1936. A "bus" – the Saxonville station agent's car – ran to Saxonville until 1943. Freight service continued until the 1980s; the Cochituate Rail Trail is now being built on the right-of-way.

The line was reduced to two tracks through Natick in 1962. Around that time, a large building was built over the 1897 station, with the old station becoming the wine cellar of a liquor store. The original inbound canopy remained for use by the public, though the only station facilities were two bare platforms. The inbound side of the station is supported by the rear wall of the liquor store, decorated with a colorful mural of the Downtown Natick area. A second station serving the town opened at West Natick in 1982 to provide additional parking. In October 1997, Natick was identified as a possible site for a parking garage. The plan was cancelled because of concerns over the financial viability of the garage.

Reconstruction

Natick Center station is not accessible; the low platforms do not support level boarding, and passage to street level is via staircases only. Inbound ridership in 2018 was 736 passengers, making Natick Center the second-busiest non-accessible station on the MBTA Commuter Rail system. Flooding of the inbound track and platform during heavy rains is a recurrent problem. In January 2013, the Town of Natick formed a formal committee to advise the town on developing plans for a rebuilt station.

In June 2014, conceptual plans were unveiled for upgrades to make the station fully handicapped accessible with high-level platforms and accessible routes from street level. The rebuilt station was to replace the existing side platforms with an island platform for cost and operational reasons, with a third track (to allow freight trains and express passenger trains to pass stopped local trains) able to fit into the wide existing trench as well. The proposal would provide better integration of the station with the surrounding streets, including a deck over parts of the trench between Washington Street and Main Street. One option with the new station and a pedestrian-only deck was projected to cost $26.0 million, while a deck incorporating a bus loop would add $17 million more.

In July 2014, the MBTA agreed to the town's request to change the station's name as part of a larger rebranding of the Natick Center area. Online maps were changed shortly thereafter, and on January 12, 2015, the station was officially renamed as Natick Center. In March 2016, $4 million for completing design of the station was included in a draft 2017–2021 MBTA capital plan.

After further MBTA review, the island platform design was replaced with two side platforms in 2017. The third center track will not be added as part of initial construction, but space will be left between the two main tracks to add it in the future. The estimated $36.5 million contract was put out to bid in August 2019. A $36.1 million contract was awarded on November 4, 2019. The 30-month construction period began in March 2020. Demolition of the canopy took place in May 2020. A temporary platform on the south side was installed later in the year. 

In July 2020, the state awarded $125,000 for design of the final  segment of the Cochituate Rail Trail, including the connection with the new station. Construction in 2021 included platform supports, drainage, and a retaining wall. In February 2022, the MBTA indicated that completion would be delayed to early 2024 due to supply chain issues and soil conditions requiring modification of a retaining wall design. By December 2022, construction was 45% complete, with the east ramps nearly finished. By that time, expected completion was further delayed to fall 2024. The east ramps were planned to put into service on January 23, 2023, to access temporary platforms east of Washington Street, allowing the old platforms to be demolished and the new permanent platforms built. However, this was delayed to February 13.

In June 2021, the MBTA issued a $28 million design contract for a project to add a third track from Weston to Framingham, including through Natick Center, with projected completion in 2030.

References

External links

MBTA – Natick Center
MBTA – Natick Center Accessibility Improvements Project Page
 Natick Center station from North Avenue on Google Maps Street View
Cochituate Rail Trail

Former Boston and Albany Railroad stations
MBTA Commuter Rail stations in Middlesex County, Massachusetts
Railway stations in the United States opened in 1834